Athletics competitions at the 1969 Micronesian Games were held in San Antonio, Saipan, Northern Mariana Islands, in July, 1969. Only athletes from those six Micronesian territories that constituted the U.S. administrated Trust Territory of the Pacific Islands were participating.

A total of 24 events were contested, 18 by men and 6 by women.

Medal summary
Medal winners and their results were published on the Athletics Weekly webpage
courtesy of Tony Isaacs.

Men

Women

Medal table (unofficial)

Participation
Athletes from the following 6 territories were reported to participate:

 Marshall Islands
 Northern Mariana Islands
 Palau
 Ponape
 Truk
 Yap

References

Athletics at the Micronesian Games
Athletics in the Northern Mariana Islands
Micronesian Games
1969 in the Northern Mariana Islands